Aracanthus is a genus of broad-nosed weevils in the beetle family Curculionidae. There are about nine described species in Aracanthus.Rajnish Krishnavanshi

Species
These nine species belong to the genus Aracanthus:
 Aracanthus assimilis Voss, 1934 i c g
 Aracanthus mourei Rosado-Neto, 1981 c g
 Aracanthus notatus Voss, 1934 c g
 Aracanthus ovalis Voss, 1934 c g
 Aracanthus pallidus (Say, 1831) i c g b
 Aracanthus paraguayanus Voss, 1943 c g
 Aracanthus robustus Voss, 1934 c g
 Aracanthus signatus Voss, 1934 c g
 Aracanthus tabaci Voss, 1934 c g
Data sources: i = ITIS, c = Catalogue of Life, g = GBIF, b = Bugguide.net

References

Further reading

 
 
 
 

Entiminae
Articles created by Qbugbot